Monkey Falls are natural waterfalls  located near the uphill ghat road Valparai on the Pollachi-Valparai road in the Anaimalai Hills range, in Coimbatore district.

Monkey Falls is about 30 km from Pollachi. Refreshing Natural Water Falls about 6 km from Azhiyar Dam. Monkey Falls is located on road connecting Pollachi and Valparai.

Getting there
An interesting trek route at the Monkey Falls; a linear stretch of evergreen forests surrounded by rocky cliffs, is available and regular guided treks are conducted during favourable season. Prior request should be given to the Tamil Nadu Forest Department headquarters at Pollachi before a fortnight.

Monkey Falls is a famous and popular tourism spot. Monkey falls is an ideal place for little children and adults to take a bath. Ticket fee is Rs 30 to enter inside the falls vicinity.

Precaution

In case if you parked the bike in roadside beware of Monkeys since it will open the tank cover and will take the things inside the tank cover. Also be careful near waterfall since in some place it will make you to slip and there is a chance of acquiring injury.

References

Waterfalls of Tamil Nadu